Mackerel Run is a 2007 South Korean television series that aired on SBS from May 12 to June 30, 2007 on Saturdays at 16:40 (KST) time slot for 8 episodes.

The high school sitcom was originally planned as a 24-episode series, but low viewership ratings in the 3-4% range led to its early cancellation.

After cast members Lee Min-ho (Boys Over Flowers), Moon Chae-won (Painter of the Wind), and Park Bo-young (Scandal Makers) rose to fame in 2008-2009, cable network tvN aired reruns of the show at 11:00 (KST) beginning February 28, 2009.

Lee, Moon and Park would later work together again in the 2008 comedy film Our School's E.T.; they were cast because director Park Kwang-chun had reportedly enjoyed watching Mackerel Run.

Synopsis
Cha Gong-chan (Lee Min-ho) was able to enter the top private high school in the affluent Gangnam District, Myoung-mun High, because of his soccer skills. But when he quits the sport, he finds himself an outcast and starts cutting class. One day, a beautiful new girl transfers to the school, and when she walks into his class, Gong-chan falls for her instantly. He is finally enthusiastic about going to school, but the school administrator informs him that he will be expelled if he misses one more day. Gong-chan vows that he won't give up on either his school life or his love.

Cast

Main
 Lee Min-ho as Cha Gong-chan 
 Moon Chae-won as Min Yoon-seo
 Kwon Se-in as Baek Heon
 Jung Yoon-jo as Yoon Sae-mi
 Ko Kyu-pil as Jang Dong-gun
 Jang Tae-hoon as Go Bong-tae

Supporting
 Lee Byung-joon as Ma Do-shik, school administrator
 Yoo Hye-ri as Heo Young-sook, Yoon-seo's mother
 Lee Bong-gyu as Min Joo-hwa, Yoon-seo's father
 Lee Kyung-jin as Lee Geum-ja, Gong-chan's mother
 Park Bo-young as Shim Chung-ah
 -- as Ahn Kyung-tae
 -- as Kim Doo-son
 -- as Yoon Taek-han
 Min Ji-hyun as Ki Yeo-woon
 Kim Joo-young as Go Kwi-dong
 Na Seok-min
 Kim Gook-bin
 Kang Hyun-jung as Kyung-hwa
 Kang Soo-min
 Choi Myung-kyung

Popular culture
A song from this series titled Summer Sunshine (also known as Dallyora Kudongo) was covered by singer Holly Lindin for the 2010 CGI animated film Barbie in a Mermaid Tale. It plays during the beginning of the film.

References

External links
 Mackerel Run official SBS website 
 

2007 South Korean television series debuts
2007 South Korean television series endings
Seoul Broadcasting System television dramas
South Korean high school television series
South Korean teen dramas
Television series about teenagers